Kaija Helena Aarikka-Ruokonen (3 February 1929 — 14 August 2014) was a Finnish designer and entrepreneur.

Early life and education
Kaija Aarikka was born in Somero to a farming family; her parents were Väinö Aarikka and Alma Maria  Kares.

She completed lower secondary school in 1945, and later studied textile arts and design at the Taideteollinen Oppilaitos school of design (now part of Aalto University School of Arts, Design and Architecture), graduating in 1954.

Career

In 1954, Aarikka co-founded together with her husband the eponymous design bureau Aarikka, to design and manufacture initially wooden buttons and decorative and household items, later expanding also into personal accessories, dress jewellery and giftware. She worked there as the firm's head designer and Artistic Director for most of her career, also taking over management duties including chairing the Board of Directors from 1977.

The first Aarikka store opened in 1960, and by the 1980s there were 20.

Aarikka is best known for her simplistic wooden designs, often in characteristic round shapes. One of her most iconic creations is the wooden Pässi ('Ram') sculpture.

From the early 1970s onwards, she also provided free-lance design services for Humppila and Ahlstrom glassworks (both now part of Iittala) as well as for Tampella textiles. One of Aarikka's glass designs for Humppila is in the British Museum collections.

Awards and honours
In 1994, Aarikka received the  medal of the Order of the Lion of Finland.

Personal life
In 1954, Aarikka married businessman Erkki Ruokonen; the couple had three daughters.

Her favourite pastimes included theatre, literature, and outdoor pursuits.

She died, aged 85, following a long illness.

Notes

References

External links
Aarikka Museum, with history of the company and the designer

Finnish designers
Product designers
1929 births
2014 deaths
People from Somero
Aalto University School of Arts, Design and Architecture alumni
Pro Finlandia Medals of the Order of the Lion of Finland